Tale is a seaside resort town, part of the former municipality of Shënkoll in the Lezhë County in Albania. At the 2015 local government reform it became part of the municipality Lezhë. Its beaches attract many tourists, especially with the increase in small local hotels.

References

Populated places in Lezhë
Villages in Lezhë County